Dr Katharina Rebay (born 16 December 1977, aka Katharina C. Rebay-Salisbury) is an archaeologist and researcher in the School of Archaeology & Ancient History, University of Leicester. She received her Ph.D. from the University of Vienna. Presently, Dr. Rebay is part of the Leverhulme Trust-funded project Tracing Networks: Craft Traditions in the Ancient Mediterranean and Beyond.  She is also an associate member of the Austrian Academy of Sciences (Österreichische Akademie der Wissenschaften).

Previously, Dr. Rebay was part of the Leverhulme Trust-funded project Changing Beliefs of the Human Body: a Comparative Social Perspective at the Department of Archaeology, University of Cambridge.  Her current research focuses on mortuary symbolism and the changing image of the human body during the Late Bronze Age and Early Iron Age in Central Europe. General research interests are mortuary analysis, Gender Archaeology, Bronze and Iron Age symbols and beliefs, and social structures of the European Bronze and Iron Age.

Notes

External links
 Dr Katharina Rebay-Salisbury's page at the University of Leicester

1977 births
Living people
Academics of the University of Cambridge
Austrian archaeologists
Austrian women archaeologists